UWM Sports Complex is an indoor soccer-specific stadium Pontiac, Michigan. The facility is one of the largest fully enclosed full-size association football arenas in the United States. It features four AstroTurf pitches: three are full-size 110x75-yard pitch, while the fourth is an 85x47-yard pitch. It was formerly known as Ultimate Soccer Arenas. 20,000 square feet.

It has 1,650 permanent seating, a full-service restaurant, a full-service coffee shop, a full service Soccer store and mezzanine level. The ceiling is 72 feet (21 m) tall. 

The facility was home of the Michigan Bucks of the USL Premier Development League, a minor-league affiliate of the Columbus Crew of Major League Soccer and the Detroit Sun FC of United Women's Soccer.  The Detroit Mechanix of the American Ultimate Disc League use the facility as well.

In 2020, it was acquired by United Wholesale Mortgage for $23.3 million, with the intention to keep the stadium open to the public and also become part of the company's Pontiac, Michigan campus.

References

External links
Ultimate Soccer Arenas Official Website

Indoor soccer venues in Michigan
Sports in Pontiac, Michigan
Sports venues completed in 2008
2008 establishments in Michigan
Ultimate (sport) venues